The 2010 G20 Seoul summit preparations encompass all the work which preceded the 2010 G20 Seoul summit.

Multiple agendas 
The G20 summit was not construed as having a global governance role, but primarily in helping to establish a new agenda to respond to new challenges.

The government of Korea was reported as wanting to use the summit as a promotional opportunity, as happened with the 1988 Olympic Games and 2002 World Cup.

The pre-planning of others was less explicit, for example North Korea

Planning for the summit encompasses nested aspects of the event, e.g., 
 Developing an understanding of each country's perspective and ensuring that it is reflected in the agenda 
 Preparing and coordinating the venue, facilities and staff required 
 Organizing arrivals, departures and accommodations 
 Coordination  with international organizations, academia, research centers, NGOs, media, government departments, and local governments 
 Media Center, including support for members of the press

Timeline
In November, sherpas representing the summit participants will have preparatory meetings  to put the finishing touches on summit planning.

Pre-summit events were scheduled in an orderly timeline as follows:
 November 11–12 (Seoul): G20 summit
 November 10–11 (Seoul): Business summit scheduled on the periphery of the G20 Summit.  Planners anticipate that chief executives of the top 20 business firms of the G20 member nations will attend.
 October 22–23 (Gwangju): G20 Finance Ministers' and Central Bank Governors' Meeting
 September 4–5 (Gyeongju): G20 Deputies' Meeting
 July — Former Ghanaian President John Agyekum Kufuor attended the preparatory meeting in Korea as the representative of the Club of Madrid, which is an organization of former democratically elected heads of state.

Sherpas

Representatives or "sherpas" from each attending nation prepared the groundwork for discussions during the G20 summit.  They met in Inchon in October to discuss the need for "civil dialogue."

Events for spouses 
Plans were developed for the wives of leaders attending the conference.  Michelle Obama, wife of the President of the United States, and Carla Bruni, wife of the President of France, announced in early November that they would not be able to participate.

Site construction
In conjunction with the summit, three artificial islands and venues are being built at a cost of 96.4 billion won.  The international leaders will meet on islands in the midst of the Han River between the Banpo and Dongjak bridges in Seoul.

The islands will be connected via a secured bridge and located between the Banpo Bridge and Dongjak Bridge. The three artificial islands will be home to the main convention hall with restaurants and a park. Initial work is expected to be completed by September.

Website, logo, and slogan 

The initial publicly visible preparatory steps were in the creation of a website.  After four months of test runs, the online venue became a platform for announcing the choice of a summit logo, which was chosen out of 2,279 entries in an open contest.  The Korean lantern logo represents light shining in the dark and also the light which welcomes guests. This forward-looking theme is repeated in the official Korean slogan — "with people to the world; with the world to the future."  The logo incorporates an image of the sun rising over the sea, and the 20 rays coming from the center represent the 20 members of the meeting.

Security
The South Korean People National Police Agency (NPA) created a special police unit as part of its efforts to enhance security at the summit.  Th NPA-lead security committee will coordinate the work of 25 government-related agencies, including:   
 Presidential Security Service
 National Intelligence Service
 Ministry of National Defense
 National Emergency Management Agency

This security will limit access some parts of the summit islands.  The waters of the Han River will be closely monitored.

World leaders attending this summit will stay at various hotels around Seoul, but, for security reasons, the press have been discouraged from writing about this aspect of summit preparations.

See also 
 2010 G20 Seoul summit
 2010 G20 Toronto summit preparations
 List of G20 summits
 United Nations Research Institute for Social Development

References

External links
 Website of the G20 Seoul Summit
 G20 Home Page 
  Community Development Forum, G20, Seoul, 2010
 2010 Seoul G20(SCV)

Summit 2010 11 Seoul